Éric Bocquet (born 8 November 1957) is a French politician  and member of the French Communist Party.

Biography 
Elected Marquillies mayor in 1995, he was re-elected following every municipal poll ever since. He is also communal advisor of the Lille Metropole urban Community. On the occasion of the French legislative elections of 2007, he submitted his candidacy to the Nord's 11th constituency but was eliminated following the first round with 5,61 % of votes.

During the Senate elections of 2011, he was elected top of the Nord department Communist Party list and became Nord Senator on 25 September 2011.

Éric Bocquet is the brother of Alain Bocquet, Nord deputy and Saint-Amand-les-Eaux mayor.

Tenures 
 Senator
 Since 1 October 2011: Nord Senator
 Municipal advisor / Mayor
 25 June 1995 - 18 March 18, 2001: Marquillies mayor
 March 2001 - 16 March 2008: Marquillies mayor
 Since 16 March 2008: Marquillies mayor

Notes and references

Annexes

Related articles 
 Nord Senators list

External links 
 French Senate - Eric Bocquet's biography

1957 births
Living people
French Communist Party politicians
People from Nord (French department)
Mayors of places in Hauts-de-France
French Senators of the Fifth Republic
Senators of Nord (French department)